Francis IV Joseph Charles Ambrose Stanislaus (Italian: Francesco IV Giuseppe Carlo Ambrogio Stanislao d'Asburgo-Este; 6 October 1779 – 21 January 1846) was Duke of Modena, Reggio, and Mirandola (from 1815), Duke of Massa and Prince of Carrara (from 1829), Archduke of Austria-Este, Royal Prince of Hungary and Bohemia, Knight of the Order of the Golden Fleece.

Biography
Francis was born in Milan. His father was Ferdinand Karl, Archduke of Austria-Este and Duke of Breisgau, his mother Maria Beatrice d'Este, Duchess of Massa and Princess of Carrara, who was the last descendant of the House of Este and, through her mother, of the House of Cybo-Malaspina.

He was a grandson of Maria Theresa of Austria, head of the House of Habsburg, and was heir to the Este states through his father, who had been invested with the succession in the imperial fies of the Este by the Perpetual Imperial Diet in 1771, just before his marriage to Maria Beatrice, although he could never actually ascend the throne during the Napoleonic era. Francis's mother was not entitled to inherit due to the Salic law in force in Modena and Reggio (but not applied in Massa and Carrara). He thus became the first member of the House of Habsburg-Este to rule the Este inheritance in Northern Italy.

Francis is distinguished for his stern and tyrannic rule by which he repressed all the democratic movements appearing during his reign, particularly following a major revolt in 1830. The harshness of the Ducal policies are illustrated by the hanging of Ciro Menotti for an attempted insurrection against the Duke (1831).

Family
In 1812, Francis married his niece the Princess Maria Beatrice of Savoy, who was the daughter of his sister Archduchess Maria Teresa of Austria-Este and King Victor Emmanuel I of Sardinia.  The couple had four children:

 Maria Theresa (1817–1886), married Henri, comte de Chambord.
 Francis V, Duke of Modena (1819–1875), married Princess Adelgunde of Bavaria.
 Ferdinand Karl (1821–1849), married Archduchess Elisabeth Franziska of Austria. Father of Maria Theresia, Archduchess of Austria-Este.
 Maria Beatrix (1824–1906), married Infante Juan de Bourbon, Count of Montizón.

Ancestry

See also
List of Dukes of Modena
House of Este
Modena

External links

|-

Francesco IV d'Este
Dukes of Reggio
Austria-Este
Nobility from Milan
Roman Catholic monarchs
1779 births
1846 deaths
Modenese princes
Generals of the Holy Roman Empire
Knights of the Golden Fleece of Austria
Grand Crosses of the Order of Saint Stephen of Hungary
Recipients of the Order of the White Eagle (Russia)
Recipients of the Order of St. Anna, 1st class
Recipients of the Order of the White Eagle (Poland)